Józefina may refer to the following places:
Józefina, Bełchatów County in Łódź Voivodeship (central Poland)
Józefina, Piotrków County in Łódź Voivodeship (central Poland)
Józefina, Wieluń County in Łódź Voivodeship (central Poland)
Józefina, Wieruszów County in Łódź Voivodeship (central Poland)
Józefina, Świętokrzyskie Voivodeship (south-central Poland)
Józefina, Masovian Voivodeship (east-central Poland)
Józefina, Kalisz County in Greater Poland Voivodeship (west-central Poland)
Józefina, Gmina Przykona in Greater Poland Voivodeship (west-central Poland)